KSLR (630 AM) is a commercial radio station in San Antonio, Texas.  It is owned by the Salem Media Group and airs a Christian talk and teaching radio format.  The studios and offices are on McAllister Freeway in San Antonio. Current station staff includes Chad Gammage - General Manager, Chris Lair - Operations Director, and Barry Besse - Program Director & Morning Ministry Host.

KSLR transmits with 5,000 watts by day, but at night when radio waves travel farther, it reduces power to 4,300 watts.  It uses a directional antenna at all times.  The transmitter and four-tower array are off Rigsby Avenue (U.S. Route 87) in China Grove.

Programming
KSLR airs shows from national religious leaders such as Allen Jackson, Greg Laurie, Chuck Swindoll, David Jeremiah, Alistair Begg, Jim Daly and John MacArthur.  Several local San Antonio pastors are also heard.  Hosts buy time on KSLR to air their programs and seek donations for their radio ministries.

History
December 1926: the station signs on as KMAC.  It broadcasts at 100 watts on 1370 kilocycles, sharing time with KONO.
1941: With the enactment of NARBA, KMAC moves to 1240, powered at 250 watts.
1948: KMAC moves to 630 kHz, powered at 5,000 watts and carrying programming from the Mutual Broadcasting System.
1975: Salem Communications purchases KMFM on FM 96.1 and Mel Taylor is hired as GM.
1977: John Walk is hired as KMFM's Program Director and hosts daily music show. 
1982: KMFM changes call sign to KSLR-FM and becomes known as SonLight Radio.  Car window stickers displaying the new call letters are given away throughout San Antonio.
1983: Salem Radio purchases KMAC – Mel Tailor GM, John Walk Program Director. Salem sells the KSLR-FM, with those call letters moving to AM. KMAC's call sign changes to KSLR.  Roy Butler hired for music shift. 
1988: Salem sold KSLR to Communicom Corporation of America based in Denver.  Bob Lepine GM, Mary Dockery GSM, John Walk Operations Mgr. 
September 1990: Dave Gordon is hired as Program Director. 
July 1992: Bob Lepine resigns and joins Family Life Today with Dennis Rainey.  Carl Dean is hired as GM, John Walk debuts as host of "Crosscurrents," a daily one-hour talk show.
1993: Mary Dockery resigns as GSM. 
August 1994: Salem re-acquires KSLR, Carl Dean stays with Communicom of America.  John Walk promoted to interim GM. 
January 1995: John Walk resigns after 18 years with KSLR.  Jeff Crabtree becomes new GM. 
July 1997: Jeff Crabtree resigns, Dave Gordon promoted to interim GM.  Adam Macmanus talk show debuts on KSLR. 
February 1998: Mary Dockery is hired as GSM. 
July 1998: Dave Gordon resigns as GM, Mary Dockery is promoted to GM. 
1999: Pat Rogers is hired. 
February 2000: Dave Gordon is hired as OM. 
September 2000: Salem acquires 930 KLUP, Pat Rogers assigned to morning show. 
January 2002: Sonny Melendrez is hired for KLUP. 
February 2002: Mary Dockery resigns, Dave Gordon is promoted to GM. 
July 2002: Pat Rodgers resigns, Sonny Melendrez hosts KLUP morning show
2002: Baron Wiley is promoted to Operations Manager/Program Director
September 4, 2004: KLUP The Loop flips to News Talk 930 KLUP.

References

External links
KSLR official website

SLR
SLR
Salem Media Group properties